Xhoi Hajdëraj (born 7 May 2000) is an Albanian professional footballer who currently play as a midfielder for Albanian club KS Kastrioti on loan from FK Kukësi.

References

2000 births
Living people
Footballers from Tirana
Albanian footballers
Association football midfielders
Kategoria e Parë players
Kategoria Superiore players
Kategoria Superiore U-21
FK Partizani Tirana players
Akademia e Futbollit players
KF Besa Kavajë players
KF Oriku players
FK Kukësi players
KS Kastrioti players